Freeway is a 1988 American neo-noir thriller film directed by Francis Delia from a screenplay by Darrell Fetty and Delia, based on the 1978 novel of the same name by then-NBC head-of-programming Deanne Barkley. It stars Darlanne Fluegel, James Russo, Richard Belzer, Michael Callan, and Billy Drago.

Premise
After her husband’s murderer escapes justice, Sarah "Sunny" Harper (Fluegel) witnesses the work of a spree killer (Drago) who shoots people on the freeway and later quotes Bible passages to a local radio station’s psychiatrist disc jockey (Belzer). Police are unwilling to listen to Sunny, but a former cop named Frank Quinn (Russo) agrees to protect her, and later the two join forces to find the deranged freeway killer before he strikes again.

Cast
 Darlanne Fluegel as Sarah "Sunny" Harper
 James Russo as Frank Quinn
 Billy Drago as Edward Anthony Heller
 Richard Belzer as Dr. David Lazarus
 Michael Callan as Lt. Boyle
 Joey Palase as Detective Gomez
 Steve Franken as Lawyer
 Brain Kaiser as Morrie
 Julienne Dallara as Roseanne Rivera
 Kenneth Tobey as Monsignor Kavanaugh
 Clint Howard as Ronnie
 Gene LeBell as Officer Berryman

Production
The killer, who turns out to be a man who calls himself "Father Eddie," drives a beat-up 1969 Lincoln Continental sedan.  The story takes place in Southern California.

References

External links
 

1988 films
1988 independent films
1988 thriller films
1980s English-language films
1980s serial killer films
American independent films
American neo-noir films
American serial killer films
American thriller films
Films based on American thriller novels
Films produced by William N. Panzer
Films scored by Joe Delia
Films shot in Los Angeles
1980s American films